Thomas Jouannet (born 30 September 1970 in Geneva) is Swiss actor.

Biography 
Jouannet started in a theatre class in Geneva, then he went to Paris and was trained by Jean Périmony.

He started his career in several French TV series and TV movies, such as The Dominici Case and Le Silence de la Mer. He also appeared as Antoine in Clara Sheller.

In 2009, he played Don Pedro in La Reine morte which is an adaptation of the play by Henry de Montherlant.

He was in a relationship with actress Alexandra Lamy from 1995 to 2003, with whom he had a daughter, Chloé, born in October 1997.

He married actress Armelle Deutsch in 2010, with whom he has two children.

Selected filmography 
Television

Film

Short film

References

External links 
 
 CV/Fiche artiste (French/English)
  CC.Communication - Book de Photos
 Interview of Thomas Jouannet (English)
 La Cité de Thomas Jouannet  on La Cité des Artistes (French)
 Fan miniSite

1970 births
Living people
Swiss male film actors
Swiss comedians
Swiss male television actors
21st-century Swiss male actors
Actors from Geneva